The Gross Asset Value (GAV) is the sum of value of property a company owns.

Besides the net asset value, the GAV is a common KPI for property funds to measure the success of the fund manager.

External links
 Definition of GAV by SEC

See also
 Net asset value

Footnotes

Property
Investment management